Hawkesbury Island is an island in British Columbia, Canada. It is located in Douglas Channel, one of the major fjords of the British Columbia Coast.

Hawkesbury Island was named by George Vancouver for Charles Jenkinson, Baron Hawkesbury, President of the Board of Trade 1786–1804.

References

Islands of British Columbia
North Coast of British Columbia